The Lady of the Camellias (Italian:La signora delle camelie) is a 1915 Italian historical drama film directed by Baldassarre Negroni and starring Hesperia, Alberto Collo, and Ida Carloni Talli. It is an adaptation of Alexandre Dumas, fils' novel The Lady of the Camellias. Another Italian version The Lady of the Camellias was released the same year.

Cast
 Hesperia as Marguerite Gauthier  
 Alberto Collo as Armando Duval  
 Ida Carloni Talli as Madame Duvernoy 
 Alfonso Cassini as Padre di Armando  
 Giulia Cassini-Rizzotto
 Marchese Mario Centurione

References

Bibliography 
 Goble, Alan. The Complete Index to Literary Sources in Film. Walter de Gruyter, 1999.

External links 
 

1915 films
1910s historical drama films
Italian historical drama films
1910s Italian-language films
Italian silent feature films
Films based on Camille
Films directed by Baldassarre Negroni
Italian black-and-white films
1915 drama films
Silent historical drama films